Simon von Sina or Simon Sinas (1810–1876) was a Greek-Austrian banker, aristocrat, benefactor and diplomat. He was one of the most important benefactors of the Greek nation together with his father Georgios Sinas.

Biography
Simon Sinas was born on August 15, 1810 in Vienna. The Sinas family came from the Aromanian settlement of Moscopole in southern Albania.  The son of Georgios Sinas, also a benefactor and diplomat, Sinas expanded his father's business. His ethnic origin has been described as Aromanian, Hellenized Aromanian, or Greek. Regardless of his ethnic origin, Sinas was part of the social-cultural Greek merchant class which maintained close relations with the newly founded Greek state of his era. He served as Greek consul in Vienna, and later as minister to Austria, the Kingdom of Bavaria, and Germany. He also made major donations to various educational and scientific foundations in Austria, Hungary, and Greece. During his time as Greek ambassador in Vienna, Johann Strauss II composed the Hellenen-Polka (Hellenes Polka) op. 203, at Simon's request, in 1856, for an annual ball of the ethnic Greek community in the Austro-Hungarian Empire.

Sinas became director of Austria's central bank Oesterreichische Nationalbank and established the Simon Georg Sina banking house in Vienna. Following the end of the Second Schleswig War (or German-Danish War) in 1864, he funded the return transport of Austrian forces from the region of Schleswig-Holstein. From 1874 onwards, Sinas held a position in the Herrenhaus of Austria.

Sinas was the donator and founder of the Hungarian Academy of Budapest, the Holy Trinity Greek Orthodox Church, Vienna, the Athens Orthodox Cathedral, the Athens Academy, and others. His father had made the foundation of the National Observatory of Athens possible. Since Sinas was also a patron of astronomers, the crater Sinas on the Moon was named after him. Sinas died in Vienna on April 15, 1876.

References

Citations

Sources

Further reading

1810 births
1876 deaths
Greek diplomats
Austrian people of Greek descent
Austrian people of Aromanian descent
Greek people of Aromanian descent
Businesspeople from Vienna
Greek philanthropists
19th-century philanthropists
Diplomats from Vienna